John Davidson (11 April 1857 – 23 March 1909) was a Scottish poet, playwright and novelist, best known for his ballads. He also did translations from French and German. In 1909, financial difficulties, as well as physical and mental health problems, led to his suicide.

Life and works

Scotland

He was born at Barrhead, East Renfrewshire as the son of Alexander Davidson, an Evangelical Union minister and Helen née Crocket of Elgin. His family removed to Greenock in 1862 where he was educated at Highlanders' Academy there and entered the chemical laboratory of Walker's Sugarhouse refinery in his 13th year, returning after one year to school as a pupil teacher.  Davidson also briefly worked in the Public Analysts' Office, from 1870–71. In these employments he developed an interest in science which became an important characteristic of his poetry. In 1872 he returned for four years to the Highlanders' Academy as a pupil-teacher, and, after a year at University of Edinburgh (1876–77), received in 1877 his first scholastic employment at Alexander's Charity, Glasgow. During the next six years he held positions in the following schools : Perth Academy (1878–81), Kelvinside Academy, Glasgow (1881–82), and Hutchinson's Charity, Paisley (1883–84). He varied his career by spending a year as clerk in a Glasgow thread firm (1884–85), and subsequently taught in Morrison's Academy, Crieff (1885–88), and in a private school at Greenock (1888–89).

London
Having taken to literature, he went in 1889 to London where he frequented 'Ye Olde Cheshire Cheese'  and joined the 'Rhymers' Club'. Davidson's first published work was  Bruce, a chronicle play in the Elizabethan manner, which appeared with a Glasgow imprint in 1886. Four other plays, Smith, a Tragic Farce (1888), An Unhistorical Pastoral (1889), Aromantic Farce (1889), and the brilliant pantomimic Scaramouch in Naxos (1889) were also published while he was in Scotland.

Besides writing for the Speaker, the Glasgow Herald, and other papers, he produced several novels and tales, of which the best was Perfervid (1890). But these prose works were written for a livelihood.

Verse

Davidson's true medium was verse.  In a Music Hall and other Poems (1891) suggested what Fleet Street Eclogues (1893) proved, that Davidson possessed a genuine and distinctive poetic gift. The late nineteenth century English novelist George Gissing read both these volumes in one day in 1893 at the British Museum Library. Yeats had words of praise for In a Music Hall. He called it, "An example of a new writer seeking out 'new subject matter, new emotions'". Yeats wrote of his emotional dispute with Davidson in Autobiographies (1955). The second collection established his reputation among the discerning few. His early plays were republished in one volume in 1894, and henceforward he turned his attention more and more completely to verse. A volume of vigorous Ballads and Songs (1894), his most popular work, which Davidson sent a copy of to George Gissing, who wrote that it "gave me thoughts", was followed in turn by a second series of Fleet Street Eclogues (1896) and by New Ballads (1897) and The Last Ballad (1899).

Dramatic works
For a time he abandoned lyric for the drama, writing several original plays.

'Testaments'
Finally Davidson engaged on a series of "Testaments", in which he gave definite expression to his philosophy. These volumes were entitled The Testament of a Vivisector (1901),The Testament of a Man Forbid (1901), The Testament of an Empire Builder (1902), and The Testament of John Davidson (1908). Though he disclaimed the title of philosopher, he expounded an original philosophy which was at once materialistic and aristocratic. The cosmic process, as interpreted by evolution, was for him a fruitful source of inspiration.

His later verse, which is often fine rhetoric rather than poetry, expressed the belief which is summed up in the last words that he wrote, "Men are the universe become conscious; the simplest man should consider himself too great to be called after any name." The corollary was that every man was to be himself to the utmost of his power, and the strongest was to rule. Davidson professed to reject all existing philosophies, including that of Nietzsche, as inadequate, but Nietzsche's influence is traceable in his argument. The poet planned ultimately to embody his revolutionary creed in a trilogy entitled  God and Mammon. Only two plays, however, were written, The Triumph of Mammon (1907) and Mammon and his Message (1908).

Family
In 1885 Davidson married Margaret, daughter of John McArthur of Perth. She survived him with two sons, Alexander (b. 1887) and Menzies (b. 1889).

Other works

Davidson was a prolific writer. Besides the works cited, he wrote many other works, including The Wonderful Mission of Earl Lavender  (1895), a novel which included flagellation erotica, and he contributed an introduction to Shakespeare's Sonnets (Renaissance edition, 1908), which, like his various prefaces and essays, shows him a subtle literary critic.

Translations
He translated Montesquieu's Lettres Persanes (1892), François Coppée's Pour la Couronne in 1896 and Victor Hugo's Ruy Blas in 1904, the former being produced as, For the Crown, at the Lyceum Theatre in 1896, the latter as A Queen's Romance at the Imperial Theatre.

Portraits

Davidson's portrait was drawn by Walter Sickert and by Robert Bryden. A caricature by Max Beerbohm appeared in The Chapbook, (1907), and William Rothenstein did a portrait of him for The Yellow Book. In Men and Memories (1931), Rothenstein said that when Max Beerbohm looked at his pictures of Davidson, he had complimented him on the 'subtle way he had handled his toupée'. Rothenstein wrote that he had not noticed that he was wearing one.

Frank Harris, a member of the Rhymers' Club described him in 1889 thus:"... a little below middle height, but strongly built with square shoulders and remarkably fine face and head; the features were almost classically regular, the eyes dark brown and large, the forehead high, the hair and moustache black. His manners were perfectly frank and natural; he met everyone in the same unaffected kindly human way; I never saw a trace in him of snobbishness or incivility. Possibly a great man, I said to myself, certainly a man of genius, for simplicity of manner alone is in England almost a proof of extraordinary endowment."Norman Alford (1996) The Rhymers' Club: Poets of the Tragic Generation , Palgrave Macmillan

Drowning

In 1906 he was awarded a civil list pension of £100 per annum and George Bernard Shaw did what he could to help him financially, but poverty, ill-health, and his declining powers, exacerbated by the onset of cancer, caused profound hopelessness and clinical depression. Late in 1908, Davidson left London to reside at Penzance. On 23 March 1909, he disappeared from his house there, under circumstances which left little doubt that he had drowned himself. Among his papers was found the manuscript of a new work, Fleet Street Poems, with a letter containing the words, "This will be my last book." His body, which was discovered by some fishermen in Mount's Bay on 18 September, was, in accordance with his known wishes, buried at sea. In his will he desired that no biography should be written, none of his unpublished works published, and  "no word except of my writing is ever to appear in any book of mine as long as the copyright endures."

The assumption that he took his own life is consistent with what is known of his temperament and his ideas. In The Testament of John Davidson, published the year before his death, he anticipates this fate:

"None should outlive his power. . . . Who kills
 Himself subdues the conqueror of kings;
 Exempt from death is he who takes his life;
 My time has come."

Influence on other poets
Davidson's poetry was a key early influence on important Modernist poets, in particular, his compatriot Hugh MacDiarmid and Wallace Stevens. T.S. Eliot was especially fond of the poem 'Thirty Bob a Week' (In Ballads and Songs (1894)).  Davidson's poem "In the Isle of Dogs", for example, is a clear intertext of later poems such as Eliot's "The Waste Land" and Stevens' "The Idea of Order at Key West".

Quotes
 "This is an age of Bovril"

Works

 The North Wall (1885)
 Diabolus Amans (1885), verse drama
 Bruce (1886 ) a drama in five acts
 Smith (1888) a tragedy
 Plays (1889)
 An Unhistorical Pastoral, a Romantic Farce
 Scaramouch in Naxos
 Perfervid: The Career of Ninian Jamieson, (1890) with 23 Original Illustrations by Harry Furniss, Ward & Downey, Ltd., London.
 The Great Men, And a Practical Novelist (1891) Illustrated by E. J. Ellis. Ward & Downey, Ltd., London.
 In a Music Hall, and other Poems (1891)  Ward & Downey, Ltd., London.
 Laura Ruthven's Widowhood (with C. J. Wills), (1892)
 Fleet Street Eclogues (1893)] 
 The Knight of the Maypole, (1903)
 Sentences and Paragraphs (1893)
 Ballads and Songs (1894) John Lane Publishers, London 
 Baptist Lake (1894) Ward & Downey, Ltd., London.
 A Random Itinerary (1894)
 A Full and True Account of the Wonderful Mission of Earl Lavender (1895)
 St. George's Day (1895)
  Fleet Street Eclogues (Second Series) (1896)  
 Miss Armstrong's and Other Circumstances (1896)
 The Pilgrimage of Strongsoul and Other Stories (1896)
 New Ballads (1897)
 Godfrida, a play (1898)
 The Last Ballad (1899)
 Self's the Man, a tragi-comedy, (1901)
  The Testament of a Man Forbid (1901)
 The Testament of a Vivisector (1901)
 The Testament of an Empire Builder (1902)
 A Rosary, (1903) Grant Richards, London 
 The Knight of the Maypole: A Comedy in Four Acts (1903)
 The Testament of a Prime Minister (1904) 
 The Ballad of a Nun (1905)
 The Theatrocrat: a Tragic Play of Church and State, (1905)
 Holiday and other poems, with a note on poetry (1906)
 The Triumph of Mammon (1907) E.G. Richards, London  
 Mammon and His Message (1908)
 The Testament of John Davidson (1908)
  Fleet Street and other Poems, (1909)
 Contributor to The Yellow Book

He translated: 
 Montesquieu's Lettres Persanes, (Persian Letters) (1892)
 François Coppée's Pour la couronne, (For the Crown) (1896)
 Victor Hugo's Ruy Blas, (A Queen's Romance) (1904)

References

Further reading
 
 John Davidson, First of the Moderns; A Literary Biography (1995) by John Sloan
 Karl E. Beckson, London in the 1890s: A Cultural History (1992)
 Princeton University Library, John Davidson Collection, 1879–1945 (bulk 1890–1909)

External links

 
 John Davidson profile at Internet Accuracy Project
 Text of Scaramouch in Naxos at La Commedia dell'arte
 
 
 Interview with John Davidson in March 1895 edition of The Bookman (New York)

1857 births
1909 suicides
Alumni of the University of Edinburgh
Suicides by drowning in England
People from Barrhead
Scottish male novelists
Scottish translators
Scottish schoolteachers
19th-century Scottish poets
19th-century Scottish novelists
19th-century Scottish dramatists and playwrights
19th-century British translators